The 2011 BBVA Compass Bowl (formerly known as the Papajohns.com Bowl and the Birmingham Bowl) was a postseason college football bowl game between a team from the Big East Conference and a team from the SEC  played at Legion Field in Birmingham, Alabama on January 8, 2011 (12 p.m. ET).  ESPN provided television coverage.

The game was initially renamed "The Birmingham Bowl" after previous title sponsor PapaJohns.com decided not to renew their sponsorship of the game.  However, on November 4, 2010, the Bowl officially changed its name to the BBVA Compass Bowl after an agreement with Spanish bank Banco Bilbao Vizcaya Argentaria was signed.

Scoring 13 points in the second quarter, Pittsburgh defeated Kentucky 27–10.

Teams
Pittsburgh (7-5, 5-2 Big East) was selected to play Kentucky (6-6, 2-6 SEC) in the game.

Pittsburgh

Pitt started the season 2-3, which came as a surprise to many after Pitt was listed as the favorite to win the 2010 Big East Football Conference championship. The Panthers received 22 of 24 possible first-place votes, and 2 second-place votes. After their slow start, the Panthers rebounded, winning 4 out of their next 5 games, improving their record to 6-4. The Panthers ended the season at 8-5 and finished as Big East Co-Champions, along with West Virginia and Connecticut. However, because of the Panthers' losses to both schools, they were not eligible for the conference's bid to a BCS Bowl Game.

Kentucky

The Wildcats began the season by winning their first 3 games, all against non-conference teams. Over the span of the next 6 games, the Wildcats won only a single game, reducing their record to 4-5. They then split the last 4 games of the season, finishing it at 6-6, good for 5th in the Eastern Division of the Southeastern Conference.

Game summary

Scoring summary

Statistics

Notes
 Dave Wannstedt, who was forced to resign after the regular season, was expected to coach Pitt in the bowl game, however on January 3, 2011, he declined to coach in the game.  Instead defensive coordinator Phil Bennett stepped in as interim head coach.

References
Notes

BBVA Compass Bowl
Birmingham Bowl
Kentucky Wildcats football bowl games
Pittsburgh Panthers football bowl games
BBVA Compass